Deborah Silcox is an American politician. She is a former Republican member of the Georgia House of Representatives from District 52 which encompassed parts of Buckhead and Sandy Springs. She lost her re-election bid during the 2020 general election.

Personal life 
Silcox was born in Sandy Springs, Georgia. She graduated from Riverwood High School and went on to receive a Bachelor of Arts degree in political science and French from the University of Georgia and a J.D. degree from Emory University School of Law. She practiced law for ten years but gave up her partnership to raise her family. She has been married for over thirty years and has two children. Her husband, Hal Silcox III, is an orthepedic surgeon.

In 2005, she was appointed by Governor Sonny Perdue to serve on both the Department of Human Resources Board and Governor's Commission for Volunteerism and Service. She was then chosen by Governor Nathan Deal to be the chairman of the Governor's Commission for Volunteerism and Service.

Political career 
Silcox ran in 2016 for the Georgia House of Representatives District 52 when incumbent Joe Wilkinson decided to not seek re-election. In the Republican primary, she defeated Graham Harris, and she then ran unopposed in the general election.

Silcox ran again in 2018 and won the Republican primary. She then faced Shea Roberts in the general election and won with 52.3 percent of the vote. During the 2019 Legislative Session, she was appointed chairman of the House MARTOC Committee, which oversees MARTA.

Silcox ran unopposed in the Republic primary for the 2020 election. She was defeated in the general election by Shea Roberts by less than four hundred votes. Silcox never officially conceded the race.

Awards 
 2017 Legislator of the Year. Named by the Georgia Ophthalmology Society.
 2018 Champion of Georgia's Cities. Named by the Georgia Municipal Association.

References 

21st-century American women politicians
21st-century American politicians
Living people
University of Georgia alumni
Emory University School of Law alumni
People from Sandy Springs, Georgia
Republican Party members of the Georgia House of Representatives
Date of birth missing (living people)
Year of birth missing (living people)